Operation Restore is a highly successful military operation that the Angolan government conducted against UNITA rebels in Autumn 1999 during the civil war.

The government captured Andulo and Bailundo. By December Chief of Staff General João de Matos said the Angolan Armed Forces had destroyed 80% of UNITA's militant wing and captured 15,000 tons of military equipment.

References

Restore